Maruša Mišmaš-Zrimšek (born 24 October 1994) is a Slovenian middle-distance runner. She competed in the 1500 metres event at the 2014 IAAF World Indoor Championships.

Competition record

References

External links
 

1994 births
Living people
Slovenian female middle-distance runners
Slovenian female steeplechase runners
Place of birth missing (living people)
Athletes (track and field) at the 2010 Summer Youth Olympics
World Athletics Championships athletes for Slovenia
Athletes (track and field) at the 2016 Summer Olympics
Olympic athletes of Slovenia
Mediterranean Games bronze medalists for Slovenia
Mediterranean Games medalists in athletics
Athletes (track and field) at the 2018 Mediterranean Games
Athletes (track and field) at the 2020 Summer Olympics